James David Hill (May 20, 1937 – September 27, 2011) was an American professional golfer. He was the brother of Mike Hill who was also a professional golfer.

Professional career
Hill was born in Jackson, Michigan. He attended the University of Detroit, where he played on the golf team. Hill won 13 times on the PGA Tour, three of which came during his career year of 1969, when he also won the Vardon Trophy for lowest scoring average. He was a member of the United States Ryder Cup team in 1969, 1973, and 1977.

Hill was known for his quick wit and biting sarcasm, and was sometimes referred to as "the Don Rickles of the golf tour". He frequently led the tour in fines and was once suspended for two months after he deliberately broke his putter on national television. At the 1966 Thunderbird Classic, Hill signed his second round scorecard that included a score of 108 on the 18th hole. Hill played in the acrimonious 1969 Ryder Cup that ended in a 16-16 tie when Jack Nicklaus made his famous "concession" of a short but missable putt to Tony Jacklin on the 18th green in the final match.

In 1970, Hill had his best finish in a major championship. He finished in solo second place at the 1970 U.S. Open played at Hazeltine National Golf Club in Minnesota.

In 1987, Hill joined the Senior PGA Tour (now the Champions Tour). He won six tournaments on that tour. Hill had a cameo appearance in the movie, Now You See Him, Now You Don't.

Controversies 
Hill finished runner-up at the 1970 U.S. Open. What gained him the most notoriety, though, was not his excellent play but his criticisms of the golf course. In the middle of the championship, before the third round, Hill was fined $150 by Joe Dey Jr., commissioner of the Tournament Players Division of the PGA of America, for "criticism that tends to ridicule and demean the club".

When first asked what he thought of the golf course, he said "I'm still looking for it". When asked what Hazeltine needed, he retorted, "Hazeltine really did lack only 80 acres of corn and a few cows. They ruined a good farm when they built this course". Hill was far from alone among the pros in his criticism of Hazeltine, which had to be extensively redesigned before getting a chance to host another men's major, again the U.S. Open, in 1991. Afterward, Hill claimed to have paid a farmer cash to borrow his tractor. If he had won the 1970 U.S. Open, Hill planned to ride the tractor out onto the golf course as he hoisted the trophy.

Another controversy involving Hill started in 1971. At the 1971 Colonial National Invitation, Hill shot rounds of 77-85 to miss the cut. On his last hole, Hill threw a ball out of a sand trap. Hill was disqualified but it was for his signing a scorecard with an incorrect score on it. When Hill went to play in his next tournament, the Danny Thomas Memphis Classic, Hill was told he was being fined $500 for conduct unbecoming a professional golfer. Hill was required to pay the fine before teeing it up in the tournament. He did so but less than a week later, Hill filed a one-million dollar anti-trust suit against the PGA Tour. In response, the tour put Hill on probation for one year. Hill then increased the amount of damages he was seeking to three-million dollars. The litigation was resolved out of court in less than a year and Hill was taken off probation.

Late in 1971 Hill played some events in Australia. He had a "series of verbal clashes" with Australian golfer Peter Thomson at the Wills Masters. The following week Hill and Thomson played the Australian Open and were paired together in the first round. The "cold war" between the two players continued as neither offered to shake the other man's hand at the beginning of the round. Through the round both did not communicate much to each other but did occasionally congratulate the other golfer when he hit a good shot.

At the 1991 Transamerica Senior Golf Championship, Hill got into a fight on the driving range with J. C. Snead. Snead was hitting shots across the range, the balls rolling near a spot where Hill was practicing. Hill yelled at Snead, then grabbed a club and came after his much bigger adversary. After punching and wrestling their way to the ground, they were separated by other players and caddies.

Personal life 
Hill died on September 27, 2011 in Jackson, Michigan after spending the last few years of his life battling emphysema.

Professional wins (24)

PGA Tour wins (13)

PGA Tour playoff record (4–2)

Other wins (5)
this list may be incomplete
1959 Michigan Open
1971 Colorado Open
1976 Colorado Open
1977 Colorado Open
1981 Colorado Open

Senior PGA Tour wins (6)

*Note: The 1988 MONY Senior Tournament of Champions was shortened to 54 holes due to weather.

Senior PGA Tour playoff record (1–1)

Other senior wins (1)
1988 Mazda Champions (with Colleen Walker)

Results in major championships

CUT = missed the half-way cut (3rd round cut in 1964 PGA Championship)
WD = withdrew
"T" indicates a tie for a place

Summary

Most consecutive cuts made – 1 (1966 U.S. Open – 1971 Masters)
Longest streak of top-10s – 3 (1974 PGA – 1975 PGA)

U.S. national team appearances
Professional
Ryder Cup: 1969 (tied, cup retained), 1973 (winners), 1977 (winners)

References

External links

American male golfers
PGA Tour golfers
PGA Tour Champions golfers
Ryder Cup competitors for the United States
Golfers from Michigan
University of Detroit Mercy alumni
American memoirists
Sportspeople from Jackson, Michigan
1937 births
2011 deaths